Lake Italy is a lake in the John Muir Wilderness of the Sierra Nevada Mountains of California. The lake is accessible via trail over Italy Pass or as an offshoot of the John Muir Trail. It was named by the USGS because its shape is similar to that of Italy.

References

Italy